Haplogroup pre-JT is a human mitochondrial DNA haplogroup (mtDNA). It is also called R2'JT.

Origin
Haplogroup pre-JT is a descendant of the haplogroup R. It is characterised by genetic marker at 4216. The pre-JT clade has two direct descendant lineages, haplogroup JT and haplogroup R2.

Distribution

Subclades
Its subclade is Haplogroup JT, which further divides into Haplogroup J and Haplogroup T.

Tree

See also 
Genealogical DNA test
Genetic genealogy
Human mitochondrial genetics
Population genetics

References

External links
Ian Logan's Mitochondrial DNA Site

JT